Fiona Iredale (born 1 December 1967) is a former Olympic athlete from Dundee, Scotland who represented New Zealand in Women's Heavyweight Judo at the 2000 Summer Olympics. She reached the quarter-finals phase of the competition.

She was a tutor for sports and sciences at Waikato Polytechnic and won a bronze medal at the 2000 Commonwealth judo tournament in Canada.

In 2005, she was team manager for the New Zealand judo team, who competed at the world championships that year.

References 

1967 births
Sportspeople from Dundee
New Zealand female judoka
Olympic judoka of New Zealand
Scottish emigrants to New Zealand
Judoka at the 2000 Summer Olympics
Living people